The following is a list of Diplomats from the United Kingdom (and predecessors) to the Electorate and then Kingdom of Hanover:

Heads of Mission

To the Duke of Brunswick-Lauenberg

1689–1692: Sir William Dutton Colt also to Hesse-Cassel and Brunswick-Wolfenbüttel

To the Elector of Hanover and others 
The same diplomat was commonly accredited to the Elector, to the Duke of Celle and The Electress Sophia, often also to the Duke of Brunswick-Wolfenbüttel
1692–1693: Sir William Dutton Colt
1693–1703: James Cressett Envoy Extraordinary
1701: Charles Gerard, 2nd Earl of Macclesfield, Charles Mohun, 4th Baron Mohun and Gregory King the Lancaster Herald Special Mission
1702–1703: Charles Finch, 4th Earl of Winchilsea
1703–1705: Edmund Poley 
1705–1709: Brigadier Emanuel Scrope Howe
1706: Charles Montagu, Baron Halifax, Lionel Sackville, Earl of Dorset, John Vanbrugh, Joseph Addison, and Peter Falaiseau (Pierre de Falaiseau)Special Mission
1708: Maj.-Gen. Francis Palmes Special Mission
1709–1714: Isaac d'Alais Chargé d'affaires 1709-1711 then Secretary
1710 and 1711: Richard Savage, 4th Earl Rivers Special Missions
1712 and 1714: Thomas Harley Special Missions
1714: Edward Hyde, 3rd Earl of Clarendon Envoy Extraordinary
1714–1837: No mission, because the Elector (later King) of Hanover was also King of Great Britain.

Envoys Extraordinary and Ministers Plenipotentiary to the King of Hanover
1838–1856: Hon. John Duncan Blight
1857–1858: Sir John Crampton
1858/1859:  George John Robert Gordon
1859–1866: Henry Francis Howard
1866: Sir Charles Lennox Wyke

References

Hanover
Kingdom of Hanover